Hagworthingham is a village and civil parish in the East Lindsey district of Lincolnshire, England.

The place-name 'Hagworthingham' is attested in the Domesday Book of 1086, where it appears as "Haberdingham" and "Hacberding(e)ham" according to Ekwall, which states the name means 'the ham [village] of the Hagworth people'. According to Mills, Domesday assigns it "Hacberdingeham", and gives an 1198 reference of "Hagwrthingham", meaning possibly "homestead of the family or followers of a man called Haguweard", from the Old English combination of a person name with 'inga' (denoting ownership) and 'hām' (homestead, village manor or estate).  

Hagworthingham church, dedicated to the Holy Trinity, was restored by James Fowler of Louth in 1859.

Thomas Drant, the clergyman and translator of Horace, was born in Hagworthingham.

See also 
 Thornbury Hill

References

External links 

 "Hagworthingham", Genuki.org.uk
 "Listed buildings in Hagworthingham", Britishlistedbuildings.co.uk

Villages in Lincolnshire
Civil parishes in Lincolnshire
East Lindsey District